The Indian Forest Service (IFS) is one of the three All India Services of the Government of India. The other two  All India Services being the Indian Administrative Service and the Indian Police Service. It was constituted in the year 1966 under the All India Services Act, 1951, by the Government of India.

The service implements the National Forest Policy in order to ensure the ecological stability of the country through the protection and participatory sustainable management of natural resources. The members of the service also manage the National Parks, Tiger Reserve, Wildlife Sanctuaries and other Protected Areas of the country. A Forest Service officer is wholly independent of the district administration and exercises administrative, judicial and financial powers in their own domain. Positions in state forest department, such as District/Divisional Forest Officer (DFO), Conservator of Forests, Chief Conservator of Forests and Principal Chief Conservator of Forests etc., are held, at times, by Indian Forest Service officers. The highest-ranking Forest Service official in each state is the Head of Forest Forces.

Earlier, the British Government in India had constituted the Imperial Forest Service in 1867 which functioned under the Federal Government until the Government of India Act 1935 was passed and responsibility was transferred to the provinces.

Administration of the Service is the responsibility of the Ministry of Environment, Forest and Climate Change.

History

In 1864, the British Raj established the Imperial Forest Department; Dietrich Brandis, a German forest officer, was appointed Inspector General of Forests. The Imperial Forestry Service was organised subordinate to the Imperial Forest Department in 1867.

Officers from 1867 to 1885 were trained in Germany and France, and from 1885 to 1905 at Cooper's Hill, London, also known as Royal Indian Engineering College. From 1905 to 1926, the University of Oxford (Sir William Schlich), University of Cambridge, and University of Edinburgh trained Imperial Forestry Service officers.

Modern agency 
The modern Indian Forest Service was established in 1966, after independence, under the All India Services Act 1951. The first Inspector General of Forests, Hari Singh, was instrumental in the development of the Forest Service.

India has an area of 635,400 km2 designated as forests, about 19.32% of the country. India's forest policy was created in 1894 and revised in 1952 and again in the year 1988.

Recruitment
Officers are recruited through an open competitive examination conducted by the UPSC and then trained for about two years by the Central Government at Indira Gandhi National Forest Academy. Their services are placed under various State cadres and joint cadres, being an All India Service they have the mandate to serve both under the State and Central Governments.

They are eligible for State and Central deputations as their counterpart IAS and IPS officers. Deputation of Forest Service officers to the Central Government includes appointments in Central Ministries at the position of Deputy Secretary, Director, Joint Secretary and Additional Secretary etc.; appointments in various Public Sector Units, Institutes and Academies at the position of Chief Vigilance Officer, Regional passport officers, Managing Directors, Inspector General, Director General etc.

Training 
On acceptance to the Forest Service, new entrants undergo a probationary period (and are referred to as Officer Trainees). Training begins at the Lal Bahadur Shastri National Academy of Administration in Mussoorie, where members of many civil services are trained for the period of 15 weeks.

On completion of which they go to the Indira Gandhi National Forest Academy at Dehradun, for a more intensive training in a host of subjects important to Forestry, Wildlife Management, Biodiversity, Environment Protection, Climate Change, Forest Policies and Laws, Remote Sensing and GIS, Forest Dwellers and Scheduled Tribes. After completion of their training, the officers are awarded a master's degree in Science (Forestry) of Forest Research Institute. The officers are taught more than 56 subjects of life sciences in these two years.

They are also taught Weapon handling, Horse riding, Motor Vehicle Training, Swimming, Forest and Wildlife Crime Detection. They also go on attachments with different government bodies and institutes such as Indian Military Academy, Sardar Vallabhbhai Patel National Police Academy, Wildlife Institute of India, Bombay Natural History Society etc. They also undertake extensive tours both in India and a short tour abroad.

After completing training at the academy, candidates go through a year of on-the-job field training in the state to which he or she is assigned, during which they are posted as Assistant Conservators of Forests/ Assistant Deputy Conservators of Forest or Deputy Conservator of Forests.

State Cadres

Cadre Allocation Policy 
The Union Government announced a new cadre allocation policy for the All India Services in August 2017.

Under the new policy, a candidate has to rank the five zones in order of preference. Subsequently, the candidate has to indicate one preference of cadre from each preferred zone. The candidate indicates their second cadre preference for every preferred zone subsequently. The process continues till a preference for all the cadres is indicated by the candidate.

Officers continue to work in the cadre they are allotted or are deputed to the Government of India.

Old Cadre Allocation Policies 
Till 2008 there was no system of preference of state cadre by the candidates; the candidates, if not placed in the insider vacancy of their home states, were allotted to different states in alphabetic order of the roster, beginning with the letters A, H, M, T for that particular year. For example, if in a particular year the roster begins from 'A', which means the first candidate on the roster will go to the Andhra Pradesh state cadre of the Forest Service, the next one to Bihar, and subsequently to Chhattisgarh, Gujarat, and so on in alphabetical order. The next year the roster starts from 'H', for either Haryana or Himachal Pradesh (if it has started from Haryana on the previous occasion when it all started from 'H', then this time it would start from Himachal Pradesh). This highly intricate system, in vogue since the mid-1980s, had ensured that officers from different states are placed all over India.

The system of permanent State cadres has also resulted in wide disparities in the kind of professional exposure for officers, when we compare officers in small and big and also developed and backward states. Changes of state cadre was permitted on grounds of marriage to an All India Service officer of another state cadre or under other exceptional circumstances. The officer may go to their home state cadre on deputation for a limited period, after which one has to invariably return to the cadre allotted to him or her.

From 2008 to 2017 Forest Service officers were allotted to State cadres at the beginning of their service. There was one cadre for each Indian state, except for two joint cadres: Assam–Meghalaya and Arunachal Pradesh–Goa–Mizoram–Union Territories (AGMUT). The "insider-outsider ratio" (ratio of officers who were posted in their home states) is maintained as 1:2, with one-third of the direct recruits as 'insiders' from the same state. The rest were posted as outsiders according to the 'roster' in states other than their home states, as per their preference.

Principal Chief Conservator of Forests
The Principal Chief Conservator of Forests (Hindi: प्रधान मुख्य वन संरक्षक) is the highest-ranking officer belonging to the Indian Forest Service who is responsible for managing the Forests, Environment and Wild-Life related issues of a state of India.
It is the highest rank of an officer of the Indian Forest Service in a State.

At times the states may have more than one post of PCCF and in that case, one of them is designated as the Head of Forest Force (HOFF). HOFF/PCCF is supported by APCCFs, Chief Conservator of Forests, Conservator of Forests, and field level functionaries, such as DFOs and Range Forest officers in their work.

Major concerns and reforms

Head of forest department in the district

Though it is also an All India Service like other 2 AIS(IAS&IPS), it is treated at par with Joint Director/Deputy Director of Agriculture or Chief Medical Officer of Health who heads the district level positions in their respective departments but are mostly subservient to Collector, who is an IAS. The Forest department is always controlled by the government through IAS officers as Principal Secretary/Additional Chief secretary to the state government. .

Corruption
As per media reports, some Forest Service officers have been found corrupt and have been arrested by Central Bureau of Investigation for bribing and corruption. In 2015, Tehelka reported that more than 30 names of Forest Service officers who might have been awarded dubious or suspect Ph.D. degrees.

Changing Name
The National Commission for Scheduled Tribes has proposed the idea of renaming the Indian Forest Service as the ‘Indian Forest and Tribal Service’.

Notable Officers

Imperial Forest Service Officer
 Cyril Beeson
 Dietrich Brandis
 Frederick Walter Champion
 Hugh Cleghorn
 Peter Clutterbuck
 James Sykes Gamble
 Edgar Peacock
 Wilhelm Philipp Daniel Schlich
 Bertram Smythies
 E. A. Smythies
 Robert Scott Troup
 E.C.Mobbs

Indian Forest Service Officers
Jal Ardeshir Master ( Chief Conservator of Forests Madras Presidency )
 Hari Singh
 P. Srinivas
 Dr. Muthoo
 Sanjiv Chaturvedi
 Hemendra Singh Panwar
 Fateh Singh Rathore

Died in the line of duty
 Shri P. Srinivas
 Shri Sanjay Singh 
 Dr. S. Manikandan

See also 
 Indian Council of Forestry Research and Education
 Andhra Pradesh Forest Department
 Maharashtra Forest Department
 Van Vigyan Kendra Forest Science Centres

References

External links
 All Officers of the Forest Service (Civil List)

All India Services
Forest administration in India
Ministry of Environment, Forest and Climate Change
1966 establishments in India

fr:Fonction publique en Inde#Fonction publique forestière indienne